

Bio 
Kevin Bard is an American multi-platinum songwriter and producer born in East Meadow, New York.  He was also the singer of Stereo Skyline and released a record on Columbia Records.

Selected Discography

References 

Songwriters from New York (state)
Year of birth missing (living people)
Living people

People from Long Island
Singers from New York (state)
Columbia Records artists